Gweesalia or Geesala is a small village situated on the Gweesalia peninsula in the Electoral Division of Rathhill, in the Civil Parish of Kilcommon, in the Barony of Erris in western County Mayo, Ireland. 

The village has a national school, a community centre that contains a cafe and boxing club, two general stores, a post office, St Colmcille's Catholic Church, and one pub.

History

Built heritage
Evidence of ancient settlement in the area include a ringfort and several reputed crannog sites in the neighbouring townlands of  An Ráith, Tulachán Dubh and Dumha Locha. Within the village itself, the local Catholic church was designed by architect Ralph Henry Byrne and opened in 1932.

Synge connection
John Millington Synge's play, The Playboy of the Western World is reputedly set in the area, and its first act is based in a fictional shebeen (unlicensed pub) in Geesala. The play's "savage hero" is partially based on a man convicted of assaulting a woman on Achill Island in 1894, the details of which were recounted to Synge while on the Aran Islands.

Transport
On Saturdays only Bus Éireann route 446 links Gweesalia with Blacksod and Ballina. Onward bus and rail connections are available at Ballina.

Sport
Geesala National School has won a number of county titles in Gaelic football and is well represented at minor, U-21 and senior levels. The village's boxing club has produced such boxers as Henry Coyle and Jimmy Monaghan, with some of its students achieving world titles in lightweight and bantamweight divisions.

See also
List of towns and villages in Ireland

References

Towns and villages in County Mayo
Gaeltacht towns and villages
Gaeltacht places in County Mayo